Iriartella stenocarpa (common name: paxiubinha-de-macaco) is a species of palm found in northern South America.

References

External links
Palmpedia

Iriarteeae
Flora of South America
Taxa named by Max Burret